Legacy of Rage is a 1986 Hong Kong action film directed by Ronny Yu. The film stars Brandon Lee in his feature film debut, Michael Wong, Regina Kent and also features a cameo appearance by Bolo Yeung, who appeared in Brandon's father Bruce Lee's last film Enter the Dragon. Bolo was honored to fight alongside Brandon as they were best friends. This was Brandon Lee's first leading role in a film (he made his acting debut with a supporting role in the television film Kung Fu: The Movie earlier that year) and the only Hong Kong production he starred in.

Plot
Brandon Ma (Brandon Lee) is a regular guy with a job and a girlfriend May (Regina Kent). He has two jobs, so he can support his girlfriend and his dream of owning a motorcycle. Brandon's best friend is Michael Wan (Michael Wong), an ambitious and murderous drug dealer. Michael also loves May and so he comes up with a plan using a corrupt police officer named Sharky (Lam Chung) that will win her for himself and get Brandon out of his way.  It seems that the corrupt cop has been using his police connections to dominate the local cocaine trade, so Michael has him killed and uses Brandon as the fall guy. Brandon goes to jail and meets Hoi (Mang Hoi), although he thinks that he will be released soon thanks to the efforts of his good buddy Michael. However, after 8 long years, Brandon finally gets out of jail and vows revenge on Michael for betraying their friendship and stealing the love of his life.

Whilst out of prison he learns that May has had his son. With the help of Hoi, Brandon tracks down Michael. Whilst engaging his guards he learns that May is dead. After killing Michael's guards, Brandon confronts and kills his former friend Michael. The movie ends with Brandon bidding farewell to his friend Hoi (who aided him in fighting Michael's guards) and leaving with his son.

Cast
 Brandon Lee as Brandon Ma
 Michael Wong as Michael Wan
 Regina Kent as May
 Mang Hoi as Four Eyes/Hoi
 Michael Chan as Yee
 Onno Boelee as Prisoner
 Tanya Lemani George as Rachel the Belly Dancer in Persian Restaurant
 Ku Feng as Prison Guard
 Bolo Yeung as Thug
 Teddy Yip Wing-cho as Mr. Yip
 Ken Lo as Michael's thug
 Blackie Ko as Michael's thug
 Ha Kwok-wing as U thug
 Ng Man-tat as Captain of the Guards
 Shing Fui-On -as Foo
 Stuart Smith as Big Papa
 Kirk Wong as Inspector Lau

Release
The film was released in theatrically in Hong Kong on 20 December 1986.

In 1987, it was screened at the Cannes Film Festival and released in Japan. On May 16, The film got his cinematic release in the Philippines, under the title of Dragon Blood.

In the US the film was released directly to Home media in 1998 after the passing of Lee, its leading star.

Reception 
Upon its 1986 Hong Kong release Lee was nominated for a Hong Kong Film Award for Best New Performer in this role.

In 1987, it was a critical success at the Cannes Film Festival and commercial one in Japan.

At one point between its Hong Kong release and the 1992 making of Lee's first lead an American Studio film the action thriller Rapid Fire, producer Robert Lawrence screened Legacy of Rage and saw Lee's potential to be an action leading man in Hollywood, which led to their collaboration.

When the film was launched in 1998 in the US, the Hong Kong action film was described as a good genre film. In News-Press, film critic Randy Myers gave it three stars describing it as a stylish, but good early film. He added that aside from its flaws it was fast-paced, energetic, and Brandon showcased a lot of talent.

Paul Harris of The Age gave it two stars saying it gives a glimmer into the largely unexplored talent of actor Brandon Lee, but found it wasn't up to par with The Crow due to the formulaic plot.

Rob Lowing of The Sydney Morning Herald gave it three star, saying it had a generic story but praised Lee's good performance and Ronny Yu's stylish direction.

References

External links

1986 films
1986 action thriller films 
1986 martial arts films
1980s Cantonese-language films
Films about violence
Films directed by Ronny Yu
Films set in Hong Kong
Gun fu films
Hong Kong films about revenge
Hong Kong action thriller films 
Hong Kong neo-noir films
Hong Kong martial arts films 
Jeet Kune Do films
Kung fu films
Triad films
1980s Hong Kong films